The 3rd constituency of Bouches-du-Rhône is a French legislative constituency in Bouches-du-Rhône. It covers the area to the north east of the city of Marseille

Deputies

Elections

2022

 
 
 
 
 
 
 
|-
| colspan="8" bgcolor="#E9E9E9"|
|-

2017

2012

|- style="background-color:#E9E9E9;text-align:center;"
! colspan="2" rowspan="2" style="text-align:left;" | Candidate
! rowspan="2" colspan="2" style="text-align:left;" | Party
! colspan="2" | 1st round
! colspan="2" | 2nd round
|- style="background-color:#E9E9E9;text-align:center;"
! width="75" | Votes
! width="30" | %
! width="75" | Votes
! width="30" | %
|-
| style="background-color:" |
| style="text-align:left;" | Sylvie Andrieux
| style="text-align:left;" | Socialist Party
| PS
| 
| 29.80%
| 
| 50.99%
|-
| style="background-color:" |
| style="text-align:left;" | Stéphane Ravier
| style="text-align:left;" | National Front
| FN
| 
| 29.87%
| 
| 49.01%
|-
| style="background-color:" |
| style="text-align:left;" | Nora Preziosi
| style="text-align:left;" | Union for a Popular Movement
| UMP
| 
| 20.21%
| colspan="2" style="text-align:left;" |
|-
| style="background-color:" |
| style="text-align:left;" | Marie Batoux
| style="text-align:left;" | Left Front
| FG
| 
| 11.19%
| colspan="2" style="text-align:left;" |
|-
| style="background-color:" |
| style="text-align:left;" | Michèle Poncet-Ramade
| style="text-align:left;" | The Greens
| VEC
| 
| 3.05%
| colspan="2" style="text-align:left;" |
|-
| style="background-color:" |
| style="text-align:left;" | Anne-Marie Tapiero
| style="text-align:left;" | 
| CEN
| 
| 1.29%
| colspan="2" style="text-align:left;" |
|-
| style="background-color:" |
| style="text-align:left;" | Gisèle Auriemma
| style="text-align:left;" | Ecologist
| ECO
| 
| 1.14%
| colspan="2" style="text-align:left;" |
|-
| style="background-color:" |
| style="text-align:left;" | Mohyiddine Alabane
| style="text-align:left;" | Other
| AUT
| 
| 0.77%
| colspan="2" style="text-align:left;" |
|-
| style="background-color:" |
| style="text-align:left;" | Hubert Savon
| style="text-align:left;" | Far Right
| EXD
| 
| 0.75%
| colspan="2" style="text-align:left;" |
|-
| style="background-color:" |
| style="text-align:left;" | Victor Hugo Espinosa
| style="text-align:left;" | Far Left
| EXG
| 
| 0.51%
| colspan="2" style="text-align:left;" |
|-
| style="background-color:" |
| style="text-align:left;" | Nouriati Djambae
| style="text-align:left;" | Ecologist
| ECO
| 
| 0.49%
| colspan="2" style="text-align:left;" |
|-
| style="background-color:" |
| style="text-align:left;" | Isabelle Bonnet
| style="text-align:left;" | Far Left
| EXG
| 
| 0.49%
| colspan="2" style="text-align:left;" |
|-
| style="background-color:" |
| style="text-align:left;" | Simone Charin
| style="text-align:left;" | Miscellaneous Right
| DVD
| 
| 0.44%
| colspan="2" style="text-align:left;" |
|-
| colspan="8" style="background-color:#E9E9E9;"|
|- style="font-weight:bold"
| colspan="4" style="text-align:left;" | Total
| 
| 100%
| 
| 100%
|-
| colspan="8" style="background-color:#E9E9E9;"|
|-
| colspan="4" style="text-align:left;" | Registered voters
| 
| style="background-color:#E9E9E9;"|
| 
| style="background-color:#E9E9E9;"|
|-
| colspan="4" style="text-align:left;" | Blank/Void ballots
| 
| 1.81%
| 
| 5.54%
|-
| colspan="4" style="text-align:left;" | Turnout
| 
| 53.19%
| 
| 53.02%
|-
| colspan="4" style="text-align:left;" | Abstentions
| 
| 46.81%
| 
| 46.98%
|-
| colspan="8" style="background-color:#E9E9E9;"|
|- style="font-weight:bold"
| colspan="6" style="text-align:left;" | Result
| colspan="2" style="background-color:" | PS GAIN
|}

2007

|- style="background-color:#E9E9E9;text-align:center;"
! colspan="2" rowspan="2" style="text-align:left;" | Candidate
! rowspan="2" colspan="2" style="text-align:left;" | Party
! colspan="2" | 1st round
! colspan="2" | 2nd round
|- style="background-color:#E9E9E9;text-align:center;"
! width="75" | Votes
! width="30" | %
! width="75" | Votes
! width="30" | %
|-
| style="background-color:" |
| style="text-align:left;" | Jean Roatta
| style="text-align:left;" | Union for a Popular Movement
| UMP
| 
| 40.76%
| 
| 50.50%
|-
| style="background-color:" |
| style="text-align:left;" | Patrick Mennucci
| style="text-align:left;" | Socialist Party
| PS
| 
| 29.30%
| 
| 49.50%
|-
| style="background-color:" |
| style="text-align:left;" | Miloud Boualem
| style="text-align:left;" | Democratic Movement
| MoDem
| 
| 7.33%
| colspan="2" style="text-align:left;" |
|-
| style="background-color:" |
| style="text-align:left;" | Jackie Blanc
| style="text-align:left;" | National Front
| FN
| 
| 6.41%
| colspan="2" style="text-align:left;" |
|-
| style="background-color:" |
| style="text-align:left;" | Jean-Paul Israel
| style="text-align:left;" | Communist
| COM
| 
| 4.12%
| colspan="2" style="text-align:left;" |
|-
| style="background-color:" |
| style="text-align:left;" | Emmanuel Arvois
| style="text-align:left;" | Far Left
| EXG
| 
| 3.27%
| colspan="2" style="text-align:left;" |
|-
| style="background-color:" |
| style="text-align:left;" | Marianne Moukomel Clarte
| style="text-align:left;" | The Greens
| VEC
| 
| 3.22%
| colspan="2" style="text-align:left;" |
|-
| style="background-color:" |
| style="text-align:left;" | Josette Mercier
| style="text-align:left;" | Ecologist
| ECO
| 
| 1.39%
| colspan="2" style="text-align:left;" |
|-
| style="background-color:" |
| style="text-align:left;" | Alain Persia
| style="text-align:left;" | Miscellaneous Right
| DVD
| 
| 1.22%
| colspan="2" style="text-align:left;" |
|-
| style="background-color:" |
| style="text-align:left;" | Roland Lombardi
| style="text-align:left;" | Movement for France
| MPF
| 
| 0.99%
| colspan="2" style="text-align:left;" |
|-
| style="background-color:" |
| style="text-align:left;" | Isabelle Bonnet
| style="text-align:left;" | Far Left
| EXG
| 
| 0.69%
| colspan="2" style="text-align:left;" |
|-
| style="background-color:" |
| style="text-align:left;" | Roland Dicchi
| style="text-align:left;" | Far Right
| EXD
| 
| 0.51%
| colspan="2" style="text-align:left;" |
|-
| style="background-color:" |
| style="text-align:left;" | Daniel Youssoufian
| style="text-align:left;" | Divers
| DIV
| 
| 0.44%
| colspan="2" style="text-align:left;" |
|-
| style="background-color:" |
| style="text-align:left;" | Stéphanie Pothin
| style="text-align:left;" | Miscellaneous Right
| DVD
| 
| 0.24%
| colspan="2" style="text-align:left;" |
|-
| style="background-color:" |
| style="text-align:left;" | Claire Aymes
| style="text-align:left;" | Divers
| DIV
| 
| 0.11%
| colspan="2" style="text-align:left;" |
|-
| style="background-color:" |
| style="text-align:left;" | Patrick Sinegre
| style="text-align:left;" | Divers
| DIV
| 
| 0.00%
| colspan="2" style="text-align:left;" |
|-
| colspan="8" style="background-color:#E9E9E9;"|
|- style="font-weight:bold"
| colspan="4" style="text-align:left;" | Total
| 
| 100%
| 
| 100%
|-
| colspan="8" style="background-color:#E9E9E9;"|
|-
| colspan="4" style="text-align:left;" | Registered voters
| 
| style="background-color:#E9E9E9;"|
| 
| style="background-color:#E9E9E9;"|
|-
| colspan="4" style="text-align:left;" | Blank/Void ballots
| 
| 1.26%
| 
| 3.39%
|-
| colspan="4" style="text-align:left;" | Turnout
| 
| 57.28%
| 
| 55.14%
|-
| colspan="4" style="text-align:left;" | Abstentions
| 
| 42.72%
| 
| 44.86%
|-
| colspan="8" style="background-color:#E9E9E9;"|
|- style="font-weight:bold"
| colspan="6" style="text-align:left;" | Result
| colspan="2" style="background-color:" | UMP HOLD
|}

2002

 
 
 
 
 
 
 
 
|-
| colspan="8" bgcolor="#E9E9E9"|
|-

1997

 
 
 
 
 
 
 
|-
| colspan="8" bgcolor="#E9E9E9"|
|-

References

3